Uroplectes is a genus of scorpions in the family Buthidae. They are known commonly as the lesser thick-tailed scorpions. There are about 40 species distributed in the Afrotropical realm. They are most diverse in South Africa.

These scorpions are generally about 3 to 6 centimeters long, but a few are smaller, such as U. ansiedippenaarae, which is less than 2 centimeters in length. They are variable in color from bright yellows to muted greens. They occur in many types of habitat from mountain forests to deserts. They live under rocks and in trees, and are sometimes seen invading houses.

Species include:

Uroplectes andreae Pocock, 1889
Uroplectes ansiedippenaarae Prendini, 2015
Uroplectes carinatus (Pocock, 1890)
Uroplectes chubbi Hirst, 1911
Uroplectes fischeri (Karsch, 1879)
Uroplectes flavoviridis Peters, 1861
Uroplectes formosus Pocock, 1890
Uroplectes gracilior Hewitt, 1914
Uroplectes insignis Pocock, 1890
Uroplectes katangensis Prendini, 2015
Uroplectes lineatus (C. L. Koch, 1844)
Uroplectes longimanus Werner, 1936
Uroplectes malawicus Prendini, 2015
Uroplectes marlothi Purcell, 1901
Uroplectes ngangelarum Monard, 1930
Uroplectes occidentalis Simon, 1876
Uroplectes olivaceus Pocock, 1896
Uroplectes otjimbinguensis (Karsch, 1879)
Uroplectes pardalis Werner, 1913
Uroplectes pardii Kovarik, 2003
Uroplectes pictus Werner, 1913
Uroplectes pilosus (Thorell, 1876)
Uroplectes planimanus (Karsch, 1879)
Uroplectes schlechteri Purcell, 1901
Uroplectes schubotzi Kraepelin, 1929
Uroplectes silvestrii Borelli, 1913
Uroplectes teretipes Lawrence, 1966
Uroplectes triangulifer (Thorell, 1876)
Uroplectes tumidimanus Lamoral, 1979
Uroplectes variegatus (C. L. Koch, 1844)
Uroplectes vittatus (Thorell, 1876)
Uroplectes xanthogrammus Pocock, 1897
Uroplectes zambezicus Prendini, 2015

References

Buthidae
Scorpion genera
Taxa named by Wilhelm Peters